Yuval Banay (born June 9, 1962) is an Israeli musician, best known as the lead singer of the influential Israeli pop rock band Mashina.

Personal life
Yuval was born in Tel Aviv, Israel, to Ilana and Yossi Banai. He was one of the more prominent members of the Banai family, which includes many noted entertainers, among them Yuval Banay's uncles Gavri Banai, Ya'akov Banai and Haim Banai (actors) and Yitzhak Banai (judge); his cousins Ehud Banai, Uri Banai, Meir Banai, and Eviatar Banai, all of whom have found success as musicians, and Orna Banai, an actress and comedian.

He married actress Orly Silbersatz in 1987, and they had three children together before divorcing in 2007. After their divorce, Banay met screenwriter and novelist Amalia Rosenblum, his partner since then. The couple have a child together, Aaron Banay, born February 2013.

Career
Banay served in the Artillery Corps of the Israel Defense Forces during the 1982 Lebanon War. While in the military, he met guitarist Shlomi Braha, with whom he formed a band. The two went in different directions after their military service ended, with Banay forming the band Shlom Ha-Tzibur ("Public Safety"). In 1984, he and Braha decided to form a new band, which they called Mashina. They released their debut album in 1985. Over the next decade, Mashina released several successful albums.

In May 1995 the group disbanded after a series of four farewell shows. Banay went on to release several solo albums: "Yuval Banay" (1997), "Rashi Dub" (1999) (produced by bass player Yossi Fine), and "Nish'ar BaMakom" ("Staying Put") (2001). Mashina reformed in 2003, and in 2005 they released an album entitled "Futuristic Romance" ("romantica atidanit"). In 2008, Banay released another solo album, "Me'ever Le'harim" ("Over the Mountains"), produced by alt-folk singer Allan Moon.

Banay has also worked as an actor, appearing in Yaky Yosha's Summertime Blues and in the movie Nadia in the 1980s, as well as in the TV series Chunt Lee (2002). Recently Banay has returned to TV, this time as a Mentor on the Israeli edition of The Voice.

His most recent musical project is titled "Mobius Trip", an electronic music project which consists of new songs as well as electronic remixes of existing work.

Aside from his musical career, Yuval Banay served as coach and mentor (alongside his teammate, Shlomi Braha) on television show, The Voice Israel in the second season.

Discography

References

External links
 Official Mashina site
 
 
 Yuval Banai at E-Online 
 Yuval Banay Quiz at LetsQuiz

1962 births
Alternative rock musicians
Yuval
Israeli entertainers
Israeli Jews
Israeli people of Iranian-Jewish descent
Israeli pop musicians
Israeli pop singers
Israeli rock musicians
Israeli rock singers
Jewish Israeli musicians
Living people
Musicians from Tel Aviv
New wave musicians
Pop rock musicians
Ska musicians